The Scottish Ambulance Service is part of NHS Scotland, which serves all of Scotland's population. The Scottish Ambulance Service is governed by a special health board and is funded directly by the Health and Social Care Directorates of the Scottish Government.

It is the sole public emergency medical service covering Scotland's mainland and islands; providing a paramedic-led accident and emergency service to respond to 999 calls, a patient transport service which provides transport to lower-acuity patients, and provides for a wide variety of supporting roles including air medical services, specialist operations including response to HAZCHEM or CBRN incidents and specialist transport and retrieval.

History
In 1948, the newly formed Scottish National Health Service (NHS) contracted two voluntary organisations, the St Andrew's Ambulance Association and the British Red Cross, to jointly provide a national ambulance provision for Scotland, known then as the St Andrew's and Red Cross Scottish Ambulance Service.

After British Red Cross withdrew from the service in 1967, the service was renamed the St Andrew's Scottish Ambulance Service. In 1974, with the reorganisation of the Scottish health services, ambulance provision in Scotland was taken over by the Scottish NHS, with the organisational title being shortened to the current Scottish Ambulance Service.

St. Andrew's First Aid, the trading name of St. Andrew's Ambulance Association, continues as a voluntary organisation and provides first aid training and provision in a private capacity.

The organisation was established as a NHS trust on 1 April 1995 when it legally became known as the Scottish Ambulance Service National Health Service Trust. The trust was dissolved on 1 April 1999 and at the same time constituted as a special health board known as the Scottish Ambulance Service Board.

Structure

Emergency Medical Service Capabilities 
The Scottish Ambulance Service now continues in its current form as one of the largest emergency medical providers in the UK, employing more than 5,000 staff in a variety of roles and responding to 740,631 emergency incidents in 20152016 alone.

The service, like the rest of NHS Scotland, is free at point of access and is widely used by both the public and healthcare professionals. Employing almost 1,300 paramedic staff, and a further 1,200 technicians, the accident and emergency service is accessed through the public 999 system.

Ambulance responses are changing in Scotland and are now prioritised according to patient needs: a traditional, double-crewed ambulance, a single response car or a paramedic practitioner may attend different kinds of emergencies.

Advanced Paramedics 
Scottish Ambulance Service Advanced Practitioners in Critical Care (APCC) are based at Raigmore Hospital, Newbridge Ambulance Station in Edinburgh and Glasgow Airport. They are considered a Yellow level response in relation to the trauma network.

Advanced Practitioners in Urgent & Primary Care (APUC) are located more widely across Scotland. Specifically at the following ambulance stations: Lerwick, Kirkwall, Stornoway, Benbecula, Lairg, Inverness, Lochcarron, Elgin, Aberdeen, Oban, Pitlochry, Callander, Perth, Dundee, Campbeltown, Paisley, Glasgow (Castlemilk fire station), Kilmarnock, Hamilton, Stranraer, Newton Stewart, Dumfries, Biggar, Melrose, Prestonpans, Edinburgh, Livingston, Falkirk, Stirling, Dunfermline, Cupar and Leven.

Ambulance Control Centres 
The Scottish Ambulance Service also maintains three command and control centres in Scotland, which facilitate handling of 999 calls and dispatch of ambulances; a further 350400 staff employed as call handlers and dispatchers fulfil this role across three locations: Edinburgh, Glasgow and Inverness. These three centres (which, through use of software, operate as one integrated unit) have been in use since 2004 and handle over 800,000calls per year. The Advanced Medical Priority Dispatch System (AMPDS) is used for call prioritisation, and provides post-dispatch instructions to callers, allowing medical advice to be given over the phone, before the ambulance arrives. Clinical staff are present to provide clinical oversight and tertiary triage. Co-located with the Ambulance Control Centres (ACC) are patient transport booking and control services, which handle approximately 1million patient journeys per year.

Role within the Scottish Trauma Network 
The Scottish Ambulance Service coordinates the pre-hospital and inter-hospital transfer elements of the Scottish Trauma Network. This response comes from the Scottish Ambulance Service and a number of partner agencies. These are sometimes categorised as Red, Yellow and Green resources; of these, Medic One and BASICS Scotland are registered charities.

Volunteer Resources

BASICS Scotland 
The service also uses a number of volunteer responders in conjunction with BASICS Scotland and the Sandpiper Trust. These responders are doctors, nurses and paramedics who volunteer their time to respond on behalf of the ambulance service and help the sick and injured. Equipment is provided to these responders by both the ambulance service and BASICS Scotland, with assistance from the Sandpiper Trust. These responders may be able to offer enhanced "Yellow" skillsets and advanced interventions to assist the other emergency services. Such skills offered by BASICS Scotland responders may include: endotracheal intubation, procedural sedation, advanced analgesia, nerve blocks, cardioversion and thoracostomy with or without drain insertion.

Community First Responder 
There are also a number of Community First Responder schemes across Scotland which support the ambulance service. These are voluntary responders with basic medical training who are deployed to 999 calls, mostly cardiac arrests.

Medic One 
Medic One is a charity team formed in 1980 which deploys from the emergency department in Edinburgh. In 1998 a charitable trust was set up, aligned to the Medic One team, to facilitate learning and development of Edinburgh hosptital staff. It has a fast response car, but relies on the Scottish Ambulance Service sending a driver to the hospital in order to attend 999 calls. The usual composition of the team is an emergency medicine consultant with a middle grade doctor, with one or two emergency nurses. They attend around three patients a month.

Tayside Trauma Team 
The Tayside Trauma Team is an enhanced care team working out of Ninewells Hospital, Dundee. They attend around six patients a month. The team is made up of staff from the Emergency department. This results in a variable mobilisation time: average time from 999 call to the team leaving the hospital is 25 minutes, with a range of 6 minutes to 1 hour 40 minutes.

Highland Prehospital Immediate Care and Trauma Team 
The Highland PICT Team is based at Raigmore Emergency Department, Inverness. It was formed in 2016 to address a lack of physician-led pre-hospital care in the Highlands. It uses a doctor and advanced practitioner model, providing advanced care and extending the capabilities of the Scottish Ambulance Service. They were winners of the Highland Heroes award in 2022, with the team's founder and clinical lead receiving an international award for his work in rural pre-hospital medicine in 2021. One of the team's advanced nurses was also nominated for a Scottish Health Award for his part in the care and rescue of a child with traumatic injuries from a mountain.

† NHS Funded             * Charity Funded

Fleet, equipment and uniform

The Scottish Ambulance Service maintains a varied fleet of around 1,500 vehicles.

Emergency response vehicles include ambulances, and single-response vehicles such as cars and small vans for paramedics. There are also patient-transport ambulances, which are adapted minibuses, lorries and support vehicles for major incidents and events, and specialist vehicles such as 4x4s and tracked vehicles for difficult access. The service also has three bicycles, which are only utilised during events at which Scottish Ambulance Service crews are present.

The geography of Scotland includes urban centres such as Edinburgh and Glasgow, areas of relatively low population density such as Grampian and the Scottish Highlands, and inhabited islands. Thus the fleet provision has to be flexible and include different kinds of vehicle. In the past, 4x4-build ambulances on van chassis were used in more rural areas, and traditional van conversions in more urban areas.

When a large fleet upgrade project was commissioned in 2016, the business case was made to move to a solely box-body on chassis build, to provide some flexibility and more resilient parts procurement. Most of these replacement ambulances have been based on either Mercedes or Volkswagen chassis, with a mixture of automatic or manual transmissions.

The equipment used on board Scottish Ambulance Service vehicles broadly falls in line with NHS Scotland and allows for interoperability in most cases. Equipment is standardised nationally and replaced at regular service intervals; for example, high-cost items such as defibrillators are costed and changed every seven years according to clinical need.

The uniform is in line with the NHS Scotland National Uniform standard, which is in keeping with the uniform standard described by the National Ambulance Uniform Procurement group in 2016. Amongst cost and comfort considerations, all Scottish Ambulance Service Staff now wear the national uniform which comprises a dark green trouser/shirt combination.

Personal protective equipment (boots, helmet and protective jackets) are issued to all staff and denote rank/clinical rank by way of epaulette and helmet markings.

Organisation

The national headquarters is located at Gyle Square, South Gyle, on the west side of Edinburgh.

There are five divisions within the service, namely:

Patient transport
The Patient Transport Service carries over 1.3 million patients every year. This service is provided to patients who are physically or medically unfit to travel to hospital out-patient appointments by any other means so that they can still make their appointments. The service also handles non-emergency admissions, discharges, transport of palliative care patients and a variety of other specialised roles.

Patient Transport Vehicles come in a variety of forms and are staffed by ambulance care assistants, who work either double- or single-crewed. They are trained to look after patients during the journey, and to provide basic emergency care.

Air operations

The service has the only government-funded air ambulance service in the UK, operated under contract by Gama Aviation. The fleet consists of two Airbus H145 helicopters and two Beechcraft B200C King Air fixed-wing aircraft, which provide emergency response and transfers of patients to and from remote areas of Scotland. 
The two previous H145 helicopters were operated under sub-contract by Babcock Mission Critical Services Onshore until May 2020.
In 20152016, the air ambulance crews flew 3,849 missions. One helicopter and one King Air are based at a Gama Aviation facility at Glasgow Airport. The other operating bases are Inverness Airport (helicopter) and Aberdeen Airport (King Air).

The aircraft based in Glasgow are regularly used by the Emergency Medical Retrieval Service (EMRS). The air ambulance service was occasionally featured as part of the Channel 5 television documentary series Highland Emergency.

Charity-funded air ambulance
In late 2012, a charity, Scotland's Charity Air Ambulance (SCAA), was founded to provide a further air ambulance, based at Perth Airport to work alongside the state-funded aircraft.
SCAA commenced operations in May 2013 with a MBB Bo 105 helicopter. Since November 2015, SCAA has operated a Eurocopter EC135. The EC135 was previously operated by the state-funded service, until they replaced the fleet with H145 aircraft. The helicopter is crewed by Scottish Ambulance Service paramedics, tasking is from the SAS ambulance control centre at Cardonald.

In April 2018, it was announced by the charity that a drive was underway to raise funds to secure a second helicopter. (SCAA holds assets and funds in excess of 12 million pounds.) This aircraft is now operational at Aberdeen Airport.

Special Operations Response Team (SORT)
The SORT service is similar to the Hazardous Area Response Team in other parts of the United Kingdom. SORT paramedics have the same scope of practice as a regular paramedic, however have an enhanced scope of practice in relation to Personal protective equipment and other rescue equipment.  They do not however carry nor administer ketamine.

In 2010, the service established three teams of specialist accident & emergency ambulance personnel who were given specialist training. This £4.3million initiative was to provide additional preparedness to be able to respond to large-scale hazardous incidents, such as those that might involve chemical, biological, radiological or nuclear material. The work was in concert with the UK government. In 2019, the SORT services responded to 1,200 calls requiring specialist intervention, and supported a further 9,000 calls.

 there are five SORT teams; three full-time based in Edinburgh, Glasgow, and Aberdeen, and two on-call teams in Inverness and Dumfries. These teams provide a specialist response to major incidents, and provide paramedic care in hostile environments. The team provides capability in arenas such as water rescue, safe working at height, search and rescue including the use of breathing apparatus, and confined space working. The SORT teams also provide a full-time emergency decontamination and inner-cordon capability.

ScotSTAR
With the remote towns and villages in Scotland often being hours away from advanced medical treatment, Scottish Specialist Transport and Retrieval (ScotSTAR) was setup incorporating paediatric and neo-natal retrieval and transfer teams and EMRS. The ScotSTAR service was set up on 1 April 2014 and transported 2,654 patients 20142015. The service uses multiple vehicles, either owned by the ambulance service or other organisations: specialist ambulances and cars, five air ambulances and HM Coastguard helicopters. The service is based in Glasgow.

EMRS (The Emergency Medical Retrieval Service) was created in 2004 by ten emergency medical consultants from Glasgow and Paisley. Initially, the service provided aeromedical cover to six isolated hospitals within Argyll and Bute. The ten consultants only had £40,000 worth of funding for medical equipment. In its first year the service transported 40 patients. In years to follow, the clinical crew began to gather evidence for the life-saving impact and cost effectiveness of the service. Following a successful 18-month trial period in the West of Scotland funded by the Scottish Government, in 2010 the service was opened up to the whole of the country, after securing permanent funding. The service is currently staffed by 47 part-time retrieval consultants, 14 retrieval practitioners, and 14 registrars, carrying out around 1000 missions every year.

Training academy
The service has its own dedicated training academy within the campus of Glasgow Caledonian University, which opened in June 2011. The facility has purpose built classrooms, lecture theatres, syndicate rooms and a clinical simulation area that recreates a 16-bed hospital ward and Accident & Emergency department allowing realistic interaction with other trainee healthcare professionals.

From 1996 until April 2011, the service used its own dedicated training college located at Barony Castle in Eddleston near Peebles. Between 1985 and 1996 it used the former Redlands women's and children's hospital in Glasgow's west end and prior to that the training school was based at Bangour Hospital before moving to Gartloch Hospital.

Facts and figures
In year ended 31 March 2020, the service:
Responded to 542,213 accident and emergency incidents.
Carried out 606,015 non-emergency patient journeys.
Flew 3,732 air ambulance missions.

Controversy and challenges 

The Scottish Ambulance Service has not been free from controversy over the years, especially recently:

In 1999 it emerged that the Financial Director of the Scottish Ambulance Service had previously been jailed for fraud.

In 2017 the ambulance service was criticised for using an ancient fleet of ambulances, with nearly half having over 100,000 miles on them.

In 2018 it was revealed that frontline staff had been working "dangerously long hours", with one staff member working a 36 hour long shift. This was described as a national scandal at the time.

2021 saw the Scottish Ambulance Service struggle to staff frontline ambulances; seeking help from firefighters, the military, and non-medical trained drivers to crew ambulances attending 999 calls. A number of tragic stories emerged highlighting the personal cost of this crisis, including one patient who died after waiting 40 hours for an ambulance, and an elderly man who died on his driveway after waiting four and a half hours for an ambulance. In the same year it was also revealed that a number of senior NHS managers from the ambulance service were running a camper van hire business during work hours, while planning for the COP26 international conference.

Research published in 2022 demonstrated that four out of five Scottish paramedics were considering quitting their jobs. It also revealed that 87% of staff do not feel valued by the Scottish Ambulance Service. The same report highlighted a third of staff working shifts lasting 15–20 hours.

The same year, a story was published in which a member of the public was asked to perform CPR on their relative, alone in the back of the ambulance without help from the ambulance crew while en route to hospital. In the summer of 2022 it was claimed that an ambulance service senior manager was suspended as a result of requesting that a member of control-room staff leave their post and collect him (and his family) from Glasgow Airport. In 2022 it also came to light that EMRS have been deploying as a “Red Team” for the Scottish Ambulance Service without a Consultant on board.

See also
 Air ambulances in the United Kingdom
 Ambulance services in the United Kingdom

Other Scottish emergency and non-emergency services:
 NHS 24
 Police Scotland
 Scottish Fire and Rescue Service

References

External links 

 
 Inspection reports from Healthcare Improvement Scotland

NHS Scotland
NHS ambulance services
Air ambulance services in Scotland
Ambulance services in Scotland